Pizzoc is a mountain of the Veneto, Italy. It has an elevation of 1,565 metres.

Mountains of the Alps
Mountains of Veneto